Ciudad Vieja (Spanish for "Old City") is an archaeological site located roughly 10 km south of Suchitoto, in the Cuscatlán Department of central El Salvador. The site served as the first location of San Salvador, now the Central American nation's capital.

Status as a World Heritage Site 

This site was added to the UNESCO World Heritage Tentative List on 21 September 1992 in the cultural category.

References 

Archaeological sites in El Salvador
Cuscatlán Department
Former national capitals
World Heritage Sites in El Salvador